Bomwali is a Bantu language of the Republic of the Congo and Cameroon.

References

Languages of Cameroon
Makaa-Njem languages